is a 1966 kaiju film directed by Ishirō Honda, with special effects by Eiji Tsuburaya. Referred by film historian Stuart Galbraith IV as a "quasi–sequel" to Frankenstein vs. Baragon, the film was a Japanese-American co-production; it was the third and final collaboration between Toho Co., Ltd and Henry G. Saperstein. The film stars Russ Tamblyn, Kumi Mizuno and Kenji Sahara, with Yû Sekida as Sanda and Haruo Nakajima as Gaira. In the film, scientists investigate the sudden appearance of two giant hairy humanoid monsters that culminates in a battle in Tokyo.

The script's final draft was submitted in April 1966. Tab Hunter was originally hired by Saperstein, choosing to replace Nick Adams. However, Hunter was replaced by Tamblyn during pre-production. Honda's contract was not renewed and had to seek employment by speaking to Tanaka on a film-by-film basis. Honda, Saperstein, and chief assistant Seiji Tani noted that Tamblyn was difficult to work with. Tamblyn did the opposite of Honda's instructions, and improvised his lines without Honda's approval. Principal photography began in May 1966 and wrapped in June 1966, with effects photography concluding in July 1966.

The War of the Gargantuas was theatrically released in Japan on July 31, 1966, followed by a theatrical release in the United States on July 29, 1970 on a double feature with Monster Zero. Since its release, the film has been regarded as a cult classic, drawing admiration from artists such as Brad Pitt, Quentin Tarantino, Guillermo del Toro and Tim Burton.

Plot
During a rainy night, a fishing boat is attacked by a giant octopus. The giant octopus is then attacked by a giant green-haired humanoid monster. After defeating the giant octopus, the green monster then attacks the boat. A survivor is recovered, who reveals to doctors and police that Frankenstein attacked his boat and ate the crew. The press picks up the story and interviews Dr. Paul Stewart and his assistant, Dr. Akemi Togawa, who once had a baby Frankenstein in their possession for study five years prior. Stewart and Akemi dispel the idea that the attack was caused by their Frankenstein, postulating that their Frankenstein was gentle, would not attack nor eat people, nor would he live in the ocean as he was found in the mountains and likely died after he escaped.

Another boat is attacked and villagers see the green Frankenstein off the coast at the same time that a mountain guide reports seeing Frankenstein in the Japanese Alps. Stewart and Akemi investigate the mountains and find giant footprints in the snow. Their colleague, Dr. Majida, collects tissue samples from the second boat. The green Frankenstein attacks Haneda Airport, eats a woman and returns to the sea after the clouds clear. Stewart and Akemi leave for Tokyo for a meeting with the military to discuss plans to kill the monster. Majida deduces that the green Frankenstein is sensitive to light. The green Frankenstein briefly appears in Tokyo, but is driven away by bright lights. It retreats to the mountains, where the military counterattacks it. Then a second Frankenstein, brown-haired in appearance, appears and comes to the green Frankenstein's aid, helping it escape.

Stewart and Akemi conclude that the brown Frankenstein is their former subject. To distinguish the monsters, the military designate the brown and green Frankensteins as Sanda and Gaira, respectively. After collecting and examining tissue samples from both monsters, Stewart concludes that Gaira is Sanda's clone. He theorizes that a piece of Sanda's tissue made its way out to sea, where it survived off plankton and evolved into Gaira. During a hiking trip, Stewart, Akemi and several hikers run away from Gaira. Akemi falls off a ledge, but Sanda saves her in time, injuring his leg in the process. Stewart and Akemi try to convince the military that only Gaira should be killed while Sanda should be spared, but the army ignores their pleas, unwilling to risk letting either monster live. After discovering that Gaira devoured people, Sanda attacks him. Gaira escapes with Sanda pursuing and heads towards Tokyo, no longer deterred by the city lights as they now alert him to the presence of food.

During the evacuation, Akemi vows to save Sanda, but runs into Gaira instead. Sanda stops Gaira from devouring Akemi and Stewart carries her to safety. Sanda tries to plead with Gaira, but the green monster engages Sanda in battle. Stewart tries to convince the military to give Sanda time to defeat Gaira, but fails. However, the military aids Sanda as his battle with Gaira moves from Tokyo to Tokyo Bay and further out to sea. As the military drops bombs around the battling Frankensteins, an underwater volcano suddenly erupts, swallowing up both monsters. Majida informs Stewart and Akemi that the monsters' deaths could not be confirmed due to the intense heat, but stresses that nothing could have survived the eruption.

Cast 

Cast taken from The Toho Studios Story: A History and Complete Filmography.

Production
The War of the Gargantuas was the third and final co-production collaboration between Toho and Henry G. Saperstein's UPA. Towards the end of 1965, Toho informed director Ishirō Honda that his director's contract would not be renewed and Iwao Mori told him that he would need to speak with producer Tomoyuki Tanaka about each assignment. Seiji Tani, Honda's new chief assistant, spoke about actor Russ Tamblyn and Honda not agreeing on set, with Tamblyn often doing the exact opposite of what Honda instructed, Tani stated: "Honda-san had to hold back and bear so much during that one. [Russ Tamblyn] was such an asshole". Tamblyn felt his lines in the film were so bad that he improvised them all. It was co-producer Saperstein's choice to replace Nick Adams with Tamblyn, later stating "Tamblyn was a royal pain in the ass".

The film was originally announced as The Frankenstein Brothers, then The Two Frankensteins, Frankenstein vs. Frankenstein, Frankenstein's Decisive Battle, and Frankenstein's Fight during script writing processes. The film was originally intended as a sequel to Frankenstein vs. Baragon, with Honda biographers Ryfle and Godziszewski noting that the continuity between the two films was "somewhat fuzzy". The film was created quickly, with writer Kimura's final draft on the screenplay being dated 23 April 1966. Honda shot the film's dramatic footage between May 9 and June 4, with Tsuburaya's special effects crew finishing in mid-July. The American version had Honda shoot additional scenes and UPA had Toho release the negatives, outtakes and other footage such as sound and music elements. Tab Hunter was originally cast as Dr. Stewart, but was replaced by Tamblyn during pre-production.

English versions
Toho commissioned an English dub, referred to as the "international dub", for overseas markets. The international dub is a direct translation of the Japanese version, keeping references to the monsters as Frankensteins and having Tamblyn's English dialogue dubbed over by another actor. In 1998, scholars Galbraith IV and Steve Ryfle named Frontier Enterprises, a Tokyo-based company, as the studio that dubbed the international version. The international dub remained unreleased until late 2017, when the film Rodan and several Godzilla films appeared on Starz's streaming service after Janus Films and The Criterion Collection obtained the rights to the films.

Co-producer Henry G. Saperstein commissioned a separate English dub from Glen Glenn Sound, a Los Angeles-based company, for the film's American release. This version omits all references to Frankenstein vs. Baragon, with the creatures being referred to as "Gargantuas" instead of "Frankensteins" or by their names. This version also includes additional footage not featured in the Japanese version, making the American version run at 92 minutes. Tamblyn's original dialogue soundtrack was lost during production and he was called back to re-dub his lines. Tamblyn worked without a script and had to rely on improvising his lines based on the footage's lip movement due to his inability to remember his original lines.

Release

Theatrical
The film was released theatrically in Japan on July 31, 1966 by Toho. The Glen Glenn Sound English dub received a theatrical release in the United States by Maron Films as The War of the Gargantuas on July 29, 1970, where it was released as a double feature with Monster Zero, which was also dubbed by Glen Glenn Sound. In the United Kingdom, the film was titled Duel of the Gargantuas. The War of the Gargantuas and Monster Zero were intended to be released earlier; however, distributors did not think that either film had potential until 1970, when Saperstein made a deal with Maron Films.

Home media
In 2008, Classic Media released a two-disc DVD of the film as a double feature with Rodan. Both films included their original Japanese versions and American dubbed versions with Rodan presented in its native fullscreen scope and The War of the Gargantuas in its original widescreen ratio. This release also features the documentary Bringing Godzilla Down to Size, detailing the history and tokusatsu techniques of the genre. In 2010, Toho released the film on Blu-ray, which includes special features such as an audio commentary by Kumi Mizuno, outtakes, trailers and behind-the-scenes photo galleries. In 2017, Janus Films and The Criterion Collection acquired the international dub of the film, as well as Rodan and several Godzilla films, to stream on Starz and FilmStruck. The international dub was made available on HBO Max upon its launch.

Legacy
In 1997, filmmaker Shusuke Kaneko stated that when planning his Gamera trilogy with screenwriter Kazunori Itō, he aimed to model it after The War of the Gargantuas. The film inspired parts of Quentin Tarantino's 2004 film Kill Bill: Volume 2, such as a miniature shot of Tokyo made specifically for the film and the fight scene between Uma Thurman and Daryl Hannah which Tarantino dubbed the "War of the Blonde Gargantuas". Tarantino had screened the film for Hannah and Hannah's character uses the word "gargantuan" several times. In 2011, manga artist Hajime Isayama cited the film's titular monsters as an inspiration for the Titans in his best-selling manga series, Attack on Titan, stating: "When I was in the lower grades of elementary school, I happened to watch a film called Frankenstein's Monsters: Sanda vs. Gaira  on a TV at a public hall during an evacuation drill. One of the two hairy monsters uprooted a tree and hit the other monster. That scene was really scary ... It was a long time ago, so it may not be an accurate memory, but it  certainly influenced the making of the [Titans]." In 2012, American actor Brad Pitt cited the film as his inspiration to pursue acting at the 84th Academy Awards.

In an episode of Scooby-Doo! Mystery Incorporated titled "Battle of the Humungonauts", the episode parodies the film by featuring two hairy creatures similar in appearance to Sanda and Gaira, riffing the film's title and even featuring a cover of Kipp Hamilton's song "The Words Get Stuck In My Throat". American film director Tim Burton noted the film was a favorite of his and his daughter's. Mexican film director Guillermo del Toro cited The War of the Gargantuas and its predecessor Frankenstein vs. Baragon as two of his top five favorite kaiju films and cited The War of the Gargantuas as an influence on the opening for his 2013 film Pacific Rim. The American band Devo performed a live version of "The Words Get Stuck In My Throat" in 1978. In August 2019, Michael Dougherty, director and co-writer of Godzilla: King of the Monsters, expressed interest in rebooting and adapting the Gargantuas for the MonsterVerse.

See also
 List of films featuring Frankenstein's monster
 List of Japanese films of 1966
 List of killer octopus films

Notes

References

Bibliography

External links 

 
 
 
 
 フランケンシュタインの怪獣　サンダ対ガイラ (Furankenshutain no Kaijū: Sanda tai Gaira) at Japanese Movie Database 

1966 films
1960s science fiction films
1960s monster movies
Films about cephalopods
Films directed by Ishirō Honda
Films set in Kyoto
Films set in Nagano Prefecture
Films set in Tokyo
Frankenstein films
Giant monster films
Japanese horror films
Japanese science fiction films
Kaiju films
1960s science fiction horror films
Toho tokusatsu films
Films produced by Tomoyuki Tanaka
Films scored by Akira Ifukube
American science fiction horror films
UPA films
Films about giants
Films about brothers
1960s American films
1960s Japanese films
Bigfoot films